Brigadier-General Hugh Frederick Bateman-Champain, CMG (6 April 1869 – 7 October 1933) was an Indian Army officer and cricketer.

Bateman-Champain was a right-handed batsman who played 11 first-class matches for Gloucestershire, with his debut for the county coming in 1888 against Yorkshire and his final first-class match for the county coming against Surrey in 1902. He also represented the Marylebone Cricket Club in a single first-class match in 1902 against Kent.

Bateman-Champain died at Ascot, Berkshire on 7 October 1933.

Family
Educated Cheltenham College and Royal Military Academy Sandhurst.

Eldest son of Colonel Sir John Underwood Bateman-Champain, KCMG, RE and Harriet Sophie Currie.

Bateman-Champain was part of a large cricketing family.  His brothers Claude, Francis and John all played first-class cricket, as did his uncles Fendall Currie, Sir Frederick Larkins Currie, Robert Currie and William Currie.

He married in Gloucester Cathedral on 3 February 1904 Dorothy Gertrude Arbuthnot, daughter of politician George Arbuthnot, and had two daughters.

Military career

He joined the West Yorkshire Regiment in 1889. He transferred to the Indian Army and joined the 1 Gorkha Rifles in 1891. During the Great War he served on the Western Front in France and then was posted to Gallipoli 1914–15. He was promoted to Brigade Commander and sent first to Mesopotamia followed by North Persia 1917–20 with 36th Indian Brigade.

He continued to serve in the Russian Civil War. During the Anzali Operation he was made prisoner of war when, on 18 May 1920, the red Russian Caspian sea flotilla under Admiral Raskolnikov with a 1500 men naval commando completely surprised the British Caspian Flotilla at Enseli in neutral Persia. In exchange for all ships (10 auxiliary cruisers and 7 transports) and weapons (50 artillery pieces with 20 000 shot) he and the British crews were released.This episode led to his being relieved of command. (Russia: Revolution and Civil War 1917-1921, Antony Beevor pp443)

He gained the rank of Colonel (Honorary Brigadier-General) in the service of the Indian Army. He retired in 1921 and became General-Secretary of the British Red Cross Society from then until his death.

References

External links
Hugh Bateman-Champain at Cricinfo
Hugh Bateman-Champain at CricketArchive
Lists of matches and detailed statistics for Hugh Bateman-Champain

1869 births
1933 deaths
People from Ashford, Surrey
English cricketers
Gloucestershire cricketers
Marylebone Cricket Club cricketers
People educated at Cheltenham College
Indian Army generals of World War I
West Yorkshire Regiment officers
Companions of the Order of St Michael and St George
Sportspeople from Gloucestershire